The general conventions and other national conventions of Alpha Phi Alpha are as follows:

References

Alpha Phi Alpha
National Conferences